To see a man about a dog or horse or duck is an idiom, especially British, of apology for one's imminent departure or absence, generally to euphemistically conceal one's true purpose, such as going to use the toilet or going to buy a drink. The original non-facetious meaning was probably to place or settle a bet on a race, perhaps accompanied by a wink. In the UK the phrase is generally used nowadays as a polite way of saying, "I am going out (or "have been out"), but don't ask where," often with the facetious implication that you are about to be, or have been, up to no good.

Historical usage 
The earliest confirmed publication is the 1866 Dion Boucicault play Flying Scud in which a character knowingly breezes past a difficult situation saying, "Excuse me Mr. Quail, I can't stop; I've got to see a man about a dog." Time magazine observed that the phrase was the play's "claim to fame". In Newcastle upon Tyne, Newcastle Brown Ale commonly gained the nickname of "Dog" from the frequent use of the phrase to describe going to the pub.

During Prohibition in the United States, the phrase was most commonly used in relation to the consumption or purchase of alcoholic beverages.

References

Further reading
 Ayto, John. Oxford Slang. 1998.
 Farmer, J.S. and W.E. Henley. Slang and its Analogues. 1986.
 Chapman, Robert L. Dictionary of American Slang. 1995.
 Matthews, Mitford M. A Dictionary of Americanisms. 1951.
 Spears, Richard A. Slang and Euphemism. 1981.
 Spears, Richard A. The Slang and Jargon of Drugs and Drink. 1986.

Figures of speech
Slang
Sociolinguistics
Quotations from literature
1860s neologisms
Metaphors referring to dogs
British English idioms